College Park High School is a public high school located in Pleasant Hill, California, United States, adjacent to Valley View Middle School and Diablo Valley College. It is part of the Mount Diablo Unified School District (MDUSD) and serves most of Pleasant Hill, a portion of Concord west of California State Route 242, a portion of Martinez, and all of Pacheco. CPHS was honored as a 2013 California Distinguished School by the California Department of Education.

History
College Park High School was founded in 1960 to alleviate population pressure from nearby Pleasant Hill High. The new institution chose the falcon for its mascot. The school had been constructed on land adjacent to Diablo Valley College, leading to the name College Park. A fierce rivalry developed between College Park and Pleasant Hill High until the latter closed. This rivalry would later be transferred to both Alhambra and Northgate High Schools.

Athletics

Notable alumni
Cori Alexander - professional soccer player and photographer
Maurice Benard - Actor on the ABC Soap Opera "General Hospital"
Rick Bodine - the plaintiff in the famed "burglar that fell through a skylight" lawsuit
Tina Dupuy - syndicated columnist and author
 McKenzie Moore (born 1992) - player in the Israeli Basketball Premier League
Meredith Patterson - Broadway, TV and film actress
Travis Raciti - defensive end for the Philadelphia Eagles
Melissa Seidemann - member of the U.S. women's water polo Senior National team; Olympic gold medalist at the 2012 Olympic Games and the 2016 Olympic Games
Trevor Larnach - Minnesota Twins outfielder and 2018 first round pick

References

High schools in Contra Costa County, California
Public high schools in California
Mount Diablo Unified School District
Pleasant Hill, California
1960 establishments in California
Educational institutions established in 1960